Alfons is the stage name of Emmanuel Peterfalvi (born March 17, 1967 in Paris), a French comedian in Germany.

Peterfalvi came to Germany for his military service in the French Army. He learned the German language and decided to stay in Hamburg, after he "fell in love with Germany and the Germans". In 1994 he began his career in the television show Kalkofes Mattscheibe on German pay TV network Premiere.

On 3 November 2017, Peterfalvi became a German citizen while maintaining his native French citizenship.

Television 
 2006–present : Alfons und Gäste (Das Erste and SWR Fernsehen)
 2007 : Deutschland lacht ...
 2009–present : Puschel TV (ARD)
 2014 : Ein Fall fürs All (ZDF) with Urban Priol

Radio 
 2008–present : Gesellschaftsabend (Saarländischer Rundfunk)
 2015–present : Bonjour Alfons (SWR1 Baden-Württemberg)

Awards 
 2021 Order of Merit of the Federal Republic of Germany

References

External links 

 Official website
 YouTube channel
 Bonjour Alfons – Website (SWR)
 

1967 births
20th-century French comedians
Mass media people from Hamburg
German male comedians
French emigrants to Germany
Living people
Südwestrundfunk people
ARD (broadcaster) people
Saarländischer Rundfunk people
French Army personnel
Recipients of the Cross of the Order of Merit of the Federal Republic of Germany